Ailes House, also known as Jones House or Chelsealy Farms, in Crystal Springs, Mississippi, is a -story wood-frame house that was built in 1860.  It was listed on the National Register of Historic Places in 1991.

It is notable as a well-preserved example of rural Greek Revival architecture that is outstanding for its grand interior proportions and for its surviving original painted decoration.

References

Houses completed in 1860
Houses on the National Register of Historic Places in Mississippi
Houses in Copiah County, Mississippi
National Register of Historic Places in Copiah County, Mississippi